The 2006 PGA Tour was the 91st season of the PGA Tour. The tour saw several notable storylines during the season: after being challenged by Phil Mickelson in the first half of the year, when Mickelson won his second straight major at the Masters and was on course to win the U.S. Open until the 72nd hole, Tiger Woods emphatically re-established his status as the dominant golfer of his era in the second half of the season by finishing with six consecutive wins, including the last two majors, and took the Player of the Year award for the eighth time in his career. Jim Furyk had his career year to date, finishing second on the money list despite picking up only two wins, due to exceptional consistency. 

It was last season of the PGA Tour before the introduction of the FedEx Cup in 2007.

Ten players won three million dollars, 31 won two million or more and 93 won one million or more. The cut off to make the top 125 on the money list and retain a tour card was a record $660,898.

The total prize money, as stated on the 2006 schedule of tournaments page of the PGA Tour website, was $256.3 million. The actual prize money was slightly higher – $258,669,218.84 (due to more than 70 players making the cut at most tournaments). If one player had played and won each of the 44 events (excluding the four alternate events), he would have won $44,209,480.

Schedule
The following table lists official events during the 2006 season.

Unofficial events
The following events were sanctioned by the PGA Tour, but did not carry official money, nor were wins official.

Location of tournaments

Money leaders
The money list was based on prize money won during the season, calculated in U.S. dollars.

Awards

Notes

References

External links
2006 PGA Tour at ESPN

PGA Tour seasons
PGA Tour